John Scott Decell (March 31, 1850 – July 10, 1931) was a member of the Mississippi Senate, representing the state's 11th senatorial district, from 1924 to 1928.

Biography 
John Scott Decell was born on March 31, 1850, in Copiah County, Mississippi. At one point, he was the sheriff of Copiah County. In 1924, he became a member of the Mississippi Senate, representing the 11th district, which was composed of Copiah County, from 1924 to 1928. He died in Hazlehurst, Mississippi, on July 10, 1931.

References 

1850 births
1931 deaths
People from Hazlehurst, Mississippi
Democratic Party Mississippi state senators